The Battle of Sinhagad, also known as Battle of Kondhana, involved an attack by the forces of the Maratha Empire during the night of 4 February 1670 on the fort of Sinhagad (then Kondhana), near the city of Pune, Maharashtra, in the Mughal Empire (present-day India). The Marathas captured the fort.

Background 

In the 1650s, Aurangzeb sent Shahiste Khan to subdue Shivaji. Khan captured Poona (Now Pune) and took residence in Lal Mahal. Shivaji  and his soldiers made a surprise attack on the Khan, wherein they wounded Khan, and killed one of his sons. However, Khan eventually escaped. Shivaji went on to loot and plunder the wealthy port city of Surat, which at that time was a centre of great riches and wealthy merchants. This greatly increased Aurangzeb's anger against the Marathas. He sent his General Mirza Rajah Jai Singh with a large army to subdue Shivaji. Jai Singh besieged Purandar fort. Meanwhile, Diler Khan defeated the armies at Vajragad, near Purandar. The Mughals plundered villages in the Maratha kingdom. For the welfare of his subjects, Shivaji decided to sign a treaty with Jai Singh. They met and signed the Treaty of Purandar. According to the treaty, Shivaji was to give 23 forts to the Mughals and agree to fight for them when needed. He would be allowed to retain control of 12 forts. Later, he agreed to meet Aurangzeb at Agra. 
 
Upon reaching Agra, Aurangzeb put him under house arrest, but Sivaji managed to escape. Shivaji then kept a low profile for some years until Aurangzeb increased activities in the north. Later, Jai Singh died at Burhanpur, and a weaker prince, Muazzam, became governor of Deccan. Shivaji then felt that this was a good opportunity to reclaim what had belonged to the Swarajya. He broke the treaty and started recapturing the forts that he had previously given the Mughals under the treaty.

Battle 
Sinhagad was one of the first forts which chatrapati Shivaji Maharaj recaptured from the Mughals. The capture was made possible by scaling the walls at night with rope ladders. In this battle both Udaybhan Rathore and Tanhaji were killed, but the fort was captured by the Marathas. The battle and Tanhaji's exploits are a popular subject for Marathi ballads.

Attack on the garrison  
Tanaji Malusare and 300 hand-picked Mavle infantry, assisted by some Koli guides, scaled the hillside using rope ladders. They advanced into the fort, killing the sentinels. The alarm was sounded and the Mughals took some time to arm themselves and come out, allowing the Marathas to secure their footing.

During the attack, Malusare scaled a steep cliff that led to the fort with the assistance of a monitor lizard called Yashwanti (also referred to as ghorpad in Marathi language). This type of lizard had been tamed since the 15th century, and Yashwanti was trained to pull the rope up the cliffs for Malusare and wind it around the fort's bastion.

Climbing up the fort, the Marathas were intercepted by the garrison and combat ensued between the guards and several infiltrators that had managed to climb up. Tanaji and his Mavala infantrymen climbed the Kalyan darwaza, one of the two main gates of the fort. The garrison fought desperately, but the Maratha Mavales wreaked havoc in their ranks. Tanaji and Udaybhan fought each other intensely, killing each other after a one on one combat. Tanaji's shield broke during the battle.

The Maratha soldiers then set fire to the cavalry's huts, and the blaze informed Shivaji at Raigad that Kondhana has been captured.

Aftermath 
When Maharaj Shivaji got the information about the victory and the loss of Tanaji's life during the battle, he exclaimed "Gad aala pan sinh gela" (Devnagari: गड आला पण सिंह गेला) (transl. "The fort has been captured but we lost the lion"). A bust of Tanaji Malusare was installed at the fort in memory of his contribution and sacrifice. The fort was also renamed Sinhagad to honor his memory.

In popular culture 
 Tanhaji - a Hindi movie of 2020, starring Ajay Devgan, depicted the battle of Kondhana.
 Raja Shivchatrapati - a Marathi TV serial of Star Pravah had episodes about this battle.

Bibliography 

 Shivaji and His Times (1920), Authored by Jadunath Sarkar, New York, USA.

References 

1670 in India
Sinhgad 1670
Sinhagad
Sinhagad
Sinhagad